Dig. Sow. Love. Grow. is the fourth studio album by American blues rock band Buffalo Killers. It was released in 2012 on Alive Naturalsound Records as a Compact Disc in addition to various colored vinyl in limited numbers.

Track listing
All songs composed and arranged by Andrew Gabbard and Zachary Gabbard.

 "Get It" – 3:11
 "Hey Girl" – 4:14
 "Blood on Your Hands" – 2:45
 "Rolling Wheel" – 3:40
 "Those Days" – 2:36
 "I Am Always Here" – 4:00
 "Farwell" – 3:54
 "Graffiti Eggplant" – 2:38
 "My Sun" – 3:46
 "Moon Daisy" – 4:44

Personnel
Buffalo Killers
 Andrew Gabbard – guitar, vocals, piano
 Zachary Gabbard – bass guitar, vocals, guitar
 Joseph Sebaali – drums, piano, harpsichord

References

2012 albums
Buffalo Killers albums
Alive Naturalsound Records albums